Martin Kraus (born 30 May 1992) is a Czech footballer currently playing for FK Králův Dvůr. He has represented the Czech Republic at U-19 level, and plays as a midfielder.

Playing career

Club career
Kraus arrived at Bohemians 1905 first team in 2010 and made his league debut against Jablonec on 4 March 2011.

International career
Kraus has represented his country at youth international level.

References

External links
 
 
 
 

1992 births
Living people
Czech footballers
Czech Republic youth international footballers
Czech First League players
Bohemians 1905 players
1. FK Příbram players
FC Sellier & Bellot Vlašim players
Association football midfielders
Footballers from Prague
Czech National Football League players
Bohemian Football League players